Margarites albolineatus is a species of sea snail, a marine gastropod mollusk in the family Margaritidae, the turban snails.

Description
The height of the shell attains 4.5 mm, its diameter 8 mm. The imperforate shell has a depressed, suborbicular shape. The short spire consists of 5 convex whorls, that increase rapidly in size. It contains many white, filiform spiral threads. There is a large, round aperture, that is iridescent inside.

Distribution
This marine species occurs off the coast of the Bering Sea.

References

External links
 To Biodiversity Heritage Library (3 publications)
 To Encyclopedia of Life
 To ITIS
 To World Register of Marine Species

albolineatus
Gastropods described in 1899